In geometry, a diagonal is a line segment joining two vertices of a polygon or polyhedron, when those vertices are not on the same edge.  Informally, any sloping line is called diagonal.  The word diagonal derives from the ancient Greek διαγώνιος diagonios, "from angle to angle" (from  διά- dia-, "through", "across" and γωνία gonia, "angle", related to gony "knee"); it was used by both Strabo and Euclid to refer to a line connecting two vertices of a rhombus or cuboid, and later adopted into Latin as diagonus ("slanting line").

In matrix algebra, the diagonal of a square matrix consists of the entries on the line from the top left corner to the bottom right corner.

There are also other, non-mathematical uses.

Non-mathematical uses

In engineering, a diagonal brace is a beam used to brace a rectangular structure (such as scaffolding) to withstand strong forces pushing into it; although called a diagonal, due to practical considerations diagonal braces are often not connected to the corners of the rectangle.

Diagonal pliers are wire-cutting pliers defined by the cutting edges of the jaws intersects the joint rivet at an angle or "on a diagonal", hence the name.

A diagonal lashing is a type of lashing used to bind spars or poles together applied so that the lashings cross over the poles at an angle.

In association football, the diagonal system of control is the method referees and assistant referees use to position themselves in one of the four quadrants of the pitch.

Polygons
As applied to a polygon, a diagonal is a line segment joining any two non-consecutive vertices.  Therefore, a quadrilateral has two diagonals, joining opposite pairs of vertices.  For any convex polygon, all the diagonals are inside the polygon, but for re-entrant polygons, some diagonals are outside of the polygon.

Any n-sided polygon (n ≥ 3), convex or concave, has  diagonals, as each vertex has diagonals to all other vertices except itself and the two adjacent vertices, or n − 3 diagonals, and each diagonal is shared by two vertices.

Regions formed by diagonals

In a convex polygon, if no three diagonals are concurrent at a single point in the interior, the number of regions that the diagonals divide the interior into is given by

For n-gons with n=3, 4, ... the number of regions is

1, 4, 11, 25, 50, 91, 154, 246...

This is OEIS sequence A006522.

Intersections of diagonals
This holds, for example, for any regular polygon with an odd number of sides. The formula follows from the fact that each intersection is uniquely determined by the four endpoints of the two intersecting diagonals: the number of intersections is thus the number of combinations of the n vertices four at a time.

Regular polygons

There exist separate formulae for calculating the length of the longest diagonal in regular polygons with an even or odd number of sides.

In an even-sided regular polygon with n sides and side length a, the length of the longest diagonal is equivalent to the diameter of its circumcircle because the long diagonals all intersect each other at the polygon's center. This is given by the following formula. 

The length of the longest diagonal of any odd-sided regular n-sided polygon (n ≥ 5) with side length a is given by the following formula.

The length of a polygon's shortest diagonal can also be calculated for all polygons (n ≥ 4) with the following formula. As the number of sides approaches infinity, the shortest diagonal approaches 2a.

These are not applicable for a triangle which has no diagonals.

Special cases include:

A square has two diagonals of equal length, which intersect at the center of the square. The ratio of a diagonal to a side is 

A regular pentagon has five diagonals all of the same length. The ratio of a diagonal to a side is the golden ratio, 

A regular hexagon has nine diagonals: the six shorter ones are equal to each other in length; the three longer ones are equal to each other in length and intersect each other at the center of the hexagon.

A regular heptagon has 14 diagonals. The seven shorter ones equal each other, and the seven longer ones equal each other. The reciprocal of the side equals the sum of the reciprocals of a short and a long diagonal.

In general a regular n-gon has  distinct diagonals in length, which follows the pattern 1,1,2,2,3,3... starting from a square.

Polyhedrons
A polyhedron (a solid object in three-dimensional space, bounded by two-dimensional faces) may have two different types of diagonals: face diagonals on the various faces, connecting non-adjacent vertices on the same face; and space diagonals, entirely in the interior of the polyhedron (except for the endpoints on the vertices).

Just as a triangle has no diagonals, so also a tetrahedron (with four triangular faces) has no face diagonals and no space diagonals.

A cuboid has two diagonals on each of the six faces and four space diagonals.

Matrices
For a square matrix, the diagonal (or main diagonal or principal diagonal) is the diagonal line of entries running from the top-left corner to the bottom-right corner. For example, the identity matrix can be defined as having entries of 1 on the main diagonal and zeroes elsewhere:

The top-right to bottom-left diagonal is sometimes described as the minor diagonal or antidiagonal.

The off-diagonal entries are those not on the main diagonal.  A diagonal matrix is one whose off-diagonal entries are all zero.

A superdiagonal entry is one that is directly above and to the right of the main diagonal. For example, the non-zero entries of the following matrix all lie in the superdiagonal:

Geometry
By analogy, the subset of the Cartesian product X×X of any set X with itself, consisting of all pairs (x,x), is called the diagonal, and is the graph of the equality relation on X or equivalently the graph of the identity function from X to X.  This plays an important part in geometry; for example, the fixed points of a mapping F from X to itself may be obtained by intersecting the graph of F with the diagonal.

In geometric studies, the idea of intersecting the diagonal with itself is common, not directly, but by perturbing it within an equivalence class. This is related at a deep level with the Euler characteristic and the zeros of vector fields. For example, the circle S1 has Betti numbers 1, 1, 0, 0, 0, and therefore Euler characteristic 0. A geometric way of expressing this is to look at the diagonal on the two-torus S1xS1 and observe that it can move off itself by the small motion (θ, θ) to (θ, θ + ε).  In general, the intersection number of the graph of a function with the diagonal may be computed using homology via the Lefschetz fixed-point theorem; the self-intersection of the diagonal is the special case of the identity function.

See also
 Jordan normal form
 Main diagonal
 Diagonal functor

Notes

References

External links

Diagonals of a polygon with interactive animation
Polygon diagonal from MathWorld.
Diagonal of a matrix from MathWorld.

Elementary geometry